The Nokia 2651 is Nokia's first entry level clamshell phone. It was described as a "stylish fold for every occasion and every budget" by Nokia's website. Although quite popular in the Latin American market, no large carriers in the US showed interest and the 2651 made almost no impression on the US market. The European version of this phone is the 2650.

Specifications

References

2651